Nancy Sit Ka-yin  (born 30 March 1950) is a Hong Kong actress on the TVB network.  Her acting career dated back to the 1960s, when she was a popular teen idol alongside Connie Chan Po-chu, and Josephine Siao. Sit recorded many albums in her teens, and later served as a mentor to Anita Mui, who went on to become one of the biggest superstars in Hong Kong history.

Sit left the entertainment business after she got married and raised a family, but in the early 1990s, her marriage fell apart when her husband left her. Sit was devastated and has said she contemplated suicide. But she thought of her children, which gave her the will to continue with life. She decided to get back into show business and was able to capitalize on the popularity she had achieved as a teen idol, even though it was so many years later.

She first starred in the long-running series A Kindred Spirit, playing one of the show's central figures. It was the longest-running series in Hong Kong history, with more than 1,000 episodes.

In 1975 she joined to Flatfoot Goes East, a film of Italian director Steno with well-known actor Bud Spencer. In this film, she plays the brief and touching role of a young mother which sacrifices herself to save the life of her son Yoko (Day Golo) from a gangster band.

Sit stars in the sitcoms, Virtues of Harmony and its sequel Virtues of Harmony II.  In Virtues of Harmony, Sit plays a boss of a Chinese restaurant in Ming Dynasty, and playing a similar character in a modern setting in its sequel, Virtues of Harmony II.

In 2000, Nancy is the first actress to be awarded the HKSAR Medal of Honour in Hong Kong.

In 2005 Nancy, and co-star William Hung, featured in the Hong Kong movie Where Is Mama's Boy. The accompanying soundtracks included theme songs from the movie that were performed by Nancy, William and Huang Yi-Fei (Wong Yat-Fei).

She also visited several countries, including Singapore and Malaysia, to promote shows in which she performed such as A Kindred Spirit and to host the Channel U variety special.

In late 2009, rumours circulated about Sit in regard to serious health problems (she had surgery to remove Gallstones and cholangitis). Around this time, she was seen walking uneasily and needing assistance in public by her daughter. As of late 2010, Sit appears to have made a full recovery.

Nancy is the first actress to be awarded "Outstanding Women Professionals Award" at "The Outstanding Women Professional and Entrepreneurs Awards 2014" organized by Hong Kong Women Professional & Entrepreneurs Association. The TVB variety show "Walk The Walk, Talk The Talk" she hosted with Wong Cho Lam is also awarded "My Favourite TVB Variety / Infotainment Programme" and "My Favourite TVB Variety Show Host" at Star Hurb Awards 2014 in Singapore.

Filmography

Television

TVB series

RTV / ATV series

Other series

Films

Theater

Program Host

Metro Radio Hong Kong

TVB

RTV

Personal life
Nancy Sit is one of five sisters. Sit has three children from her ex marriage to Shek, Jamie, Justina and Jackson Shih. Justina and Jackson reside in the United States and Jamie with her in Hong Kong.

Since Sit was admitted to the hospital for gallstone removal in Mar 2009, as of 2010 all three of her children returned to Hong Kong to lessen her work load and start a career in Hong Kong. Justina acts as Sit's manager as well as looking after Mother Hong Kong Arts Centre.

Sit's address has been leaked after her Mid-Levels apartment was among the developments that were locked down by the Hong Kong Government on March 13, 2021, in a bid to contain a new COVID-19 outbreak.

Awards

Performance Awards

Other Awards

References

External links

 Nancy Sit Ka-Yin at hkmdb.com
 Nancy Sit at senscritique.com
 Nancy Sit at lovehkfilm.com

1950 births
Living people
Hong Kong film actresses
Hong Kong television actresses
TVB actors
20th-century Hong Kong actresses
21st-century Hong Kong actresses
Hong Kong television presenters
Hong Kong women television presenters
Hong Kong child actresses
Hong Kong women comedians